Mike Bocchino (born July 24, 1971) is an American politician who served in the Connecticut House of Representatives from the 150th district from 2015 to 2019.

References

1971 births
Living people
People from Greenwich, Connecticut
Republican Party members of the Connecticut House of Representatives